The 2014 Karjala Tournament was played between 6–9 November 2014. The Czech Republic, Finland, Sweden and Russia played a round-robin for a total of three games per team and six games in total. Five of the matches were played in the Hartwall Areena in Helsinki, Finland, and one match in the Tegera Arena in Leksand, Sweden. The tournament was won by Sweden before Finland, making it the first time Sweden won the tournament since 1997. The tournament was part of 2014–15 Euro Hockey Tour.

Standings

Games
All times are local.
Helsinki – (Eastern European Time – UTC+2) Leksand – (Central European Time – UTC+1)

References

2014–15 in Swedish ice hockey
2014–15 Euro Hockey Tour
Karjala Tournament
November 2014 sports events in Europe
2010s in Helsinki
Events in Leksand
Sport in Leksand
Sports competitions in Dalarna County